Esterino is a male Italian given name. People with the name include:
Esterino Montino (born 1948), Italian politician
Lino Esterino Garavaglia (1927–2020), Italian prelate of the Catholic Church

See also
Esterio

Masculine given names
Italian masculine given names